YES 933, formerly known as 933醉心频道 (933 Zuìxīn píndào, "933 Intoxicated Channel"), is a Mandarin radio station owned by Mediacorp in Singapore. The station now holds the slogan of 顶尖流行音乐电台，引领潮流时代 (Top pop music station, leading the trend). It is a 24-hour music station that plays contemporary hits. It also includes a modern trendy mixture of lifestyle, food and travel tips as well as on weekend getaways. This is a station that caters to youngsters by allowing them to get informed about what is trending now in terms of life and playing fresh new launch songs as a global premiere in the first minute. YES 933 ended its broadcast on 20 January 2017 at 10:00 at Caldecott Broadcast Centre and thereafter, moved to the new campus at 1 Stars Avenue. The first programme was broadcast there from 12:00 on the same day.

History
Singapore Radio began in 1936 with stations each broadcasting in its four official languages - namely Radio One (English), Radio Two (Malay), Radio Three (Chinese) and Radio Four (Tamil). The then owner - Singapore Broadcasting Corporation - launched a revamp campaign and started several stations targeting different segments of the population. Perfect Ten 98.7 FM began in 1989 to play English hits for the youth, while its Chinese equivalent, YES 933 began broadcasting on 1 January 1990 at 09:33. The Malay equivalent, Ria 89.7FM began in December of the same year.

YES 933 began as an 18-hour station, broadcasting from 06:00 to 24:00. Broadcasting hours were extended to 02:00 in December of the same year, making it the first Chinese radio station to offer music after midnight. It finally went 24 hours on 1 May 1994.

Shows produced 
 Dear DJ (亲爱的九月)
 Hey DJ!  (校园新生代 Hey DJ!) 
 The Story Between Us (我们之间的故事)
 Campushunter (校园搜查队)

External links

See also
List of radio stations in Singapore

References

1990 establishments in Singapore
Radio stations in Singapore
Mandarin-language radio stations
Radio stations established in 1990